Halaelurus is a genus of catsharks in the family Scyliorhinidae.

Species
 Halaelurus boesemani S. Springer & D'Aubrey, 1972 (speckled catshark)
 Halaelurus buergeri (J. P. Müller & Henle, 1838) (blackspotted catshark)
 Halaelurus lineatus Bass, D'Aubrey & Kistnasamy, 1975 (lined catshark)
 Halaelurus maculosus W. T. White, Last & Stevens, 2007 (Indonesian speckled catshark)
 Halaelurus natalensis (Regan, 1904) (tiger catshark)
 Halaelurus quagga (Alcock, 1899) (quagga catshark)
 Halaelurus sellus W. T. White, Last & Stevens, 2007 (rusty catshark)

References

 

 
Shark genera
Taxa named by Theodore Gill